Sean Edwin Marshall is an American former actor and singer who started acting in 1971 at the age of six.

Early life and education 
Marshall was born the Canoga Park neighborhood of Los Angeles. In 1978, he left the entertainment industry to pursue an education at Notre Dame College Prep. In 1983, he received a congressional appointment to the United States Merchant Marine Academy at Kings Point, New York. In 1987, he graduated with a Bachelor of Science degree in marine transportation and an officer's appointment in the United States Maritime Service.

Career 
He was in more than ten movies including The Deadly Trackers, The New Adventures of Heidi and the Disney animated short film The Small One, but he is most commonly known for playing the protagonist Pete in the 1977 Disney movie Pete's Dragon for which he earned a gold record.

He also starred in two television series The Fitzpatricks which aired in 1977–78 for 13 episodes and The MacKenzies of Paradise Cove which aired in 1979 for 6 episodes. Marshall was a guest star in many of the popular series of his time including Kung Fu, Emergency!, Code R, The Carol Burnett Show and Tony Orlando and Dawn to name a few. Marshall was also a prolific TV commercial, radio, print and stage actor during seven years in the entertainment industry. He later served in the United States Navy Reserve.

Personal life 
Marshall lives in Santa Fe, New Mexico.

Filmography

External links

Living people
American male film actors
American male television actors
American male child actors
American child singers
United States Merchant Marine Academy alumni
Actors from Santa Fe, New Mexico
People from Canoga Park, Los Angeles
Musicians from Santa Fe, New Mexico
Year of birth missing (living people)